Evloghios (Hessler) (secular name Klaus Augustin Hessler; February 21, 1935 – January 20, 2019) was Archbishop of Milan and Longobardia and Metropolitan of Aquileia and Western Europe, and Primate of the Holy Synod of Milan.

The Holy Synod of Milan is not recognized by any mainstream Eastern Orthodox Church, therefore the church and its members are not in communion with any mainstream Eastern Orthodox denomination worldwide.

1935 births
2019 deaths
Eastern Orthodox Christians from Germany
Old Calendarism